Albert Lister Peace (26 January 1844 – 14 March 1912) was a British organist, arranger, composer, editor and author who first played the organ professionally at the age of nine. He went on to become the organist for Glasgow Cathedral, St George's Hall (as successor to W. T. Best), Canterbury Cathedral and Newcastle Cathedral. He was also the University of Glasgow organist between 1870 and 1880.

WorldCat states he had 81 works in 109 publications.

Early life
Peace was born on 26 January 1844 in Huddersfield, England. He learned to play the organ at an early age, becoming the organist of Holmfirth parish church at the age of nine.

Career
Upon his appointment to Liverpool's St George's Hall, the Music Teachers National Association described Peace as "one of the finest interpreters of the organ classics that England has ever seen".

Kinnoull Parish Church
In April 1896, Peace was guest of honour at Kinnoull Parish Church for the unveiling of the congregation's new electric organ, the product of Hope–Jones Organ Company of Birkenhead. The organ cases were designed by local architect David Smart.

Death
Peace died on 14 March 1912, aged 68, in Liverpool, England. He is buried in the graveyard of St Mary's Church, Sefton, Merseyside.

References

External links 
 
 
Albert Lister Peace – Find a Grave

English classical organists
English male classical composers
19th-century English writers
People from Huddersfield
1844 births
1912 deaths
19th-century organists
20th-century organists
English classical composers
20th-century English writers
19th-century English male writers
20th-century English male writers
People associated with the University of Glasgow
Canterbury Cathedral
Glasgow Cathedral